Cyme wandammenensae is a moth of the family Erebidae. It is found in New Guinea.

References

Nudariina
Moths described in 1916
Moths of New Guinea